The Mgwali River is a river in Eastern Cape of South Africa.

The Mgwali is a tributary of the Mbhashe, a main river that drains into the Indian Ocean through an estuary located near the lighthouse at Bashee, south of Mhlanganisweni.

References

Rivers of the Eastern Cape